Admiral Mann was a Danish vessel built in 1782 that came into British hands in 1799. She first appeared in Lloyd's Register in 1800, and then more legibly in 1801 (though with the name Admiral Man), with W. Tear, master, Burridge, owner, and trade Portsmouth transport. The transport Admiral Mann was among several vessels wrecked at Alexandria, Egypt, at the end of January 1802.  Her entry in the Register of Shipping for 1802 is marked "Lost".

Citations

1782 ships
Ships built in Denmark
Age of Sail merchant ships
Merchant ships of the United Kingdom
Maritime incidents in 1802
Shipwrecks of Egypt
Shipwrecks in the Mediterranean Sea